West Virginia Route 75 is an east–west state route located within Wayne County, West Virginia. The western terminus of the route is at U.S. Route 60 (Oak Street) in Kenova. From US 60, WV 75 proceeds to the south then east towards its eastern terminus at West Virginia Route 152 north of Lavalette.

WV 75 runs concurrent to U.S. Route 52 (Tolsia Highway) from Interstate 64 south for three miles (5 km) to the incomplete diamond interchange.

Major intersections

References

075
Transportation in Wayne County, West Virginia